No Vacation for Mr. Mayor (original title "Pas de vacances pour Monsieur le Maire") is a French comedy film from 1951, directed by Maurice Labro, written by Christian Duvaleix, starring Grégoire Aslan and Louis de Funès.

Cast 
 André Claveau: Philippe Lebon, the singer
 Grégoire Aslan: Mr Beaudubec
 Albert Duvaleix: the mayor
 Jacques Emmanuel: Adolphe
 Fernande Montel: Maharanée
 Sylvie Pelayo: Annie
 Fred Pasquali: Tracassin
 Noël Roquevert: Uncle Joachim
 Louis de Funès: the adviser
 Jo Charrier: the photographer
 Emmanuel Cheval: the concierge

References

External links 
 
 Pas de vacances pour Monsieur le Maire (1951) at the Films de France

1951 films
French comedy films
1950s French-language films
French black-and-white films
Films directed by Maurice Labro
1951 comedy films
1950s French films